The 1880 United States presidential election in California was held on November 2, 1880, as part of the 1880 United States presidential election. State voters chose six representatives, or electors, to the Electoral College, who voted for president and vice president.

California narrowly voted for the Democratic nominee, United States Army officer Winfield Hancock, over the Republican nominee, Ohio representative  James A. Garfield. The 144-vote margin was the smallest in any statewide presidential election since Henry Clay won Maryland by only four votes in 1832, and as of 2020 it stands as by percentage of the vote the eleventh-closest statewide presidential election result on record – although California would later see even closer results in 1892 and 1912.

At the time, voters in California voted for individual electors, with the top six candidates being elected. In this close election, one elector pledged to Garfield actually polled more votes than the sixth place Democratic elector, and was thus elected. This was the first occasion in which California's electoral vote was split, rather than being awarded to a single candidate. This would subsequently occur in California three additional times in 1892, 1896, and 1912. 

This result constituted the first Democratic victory in California since 1856 when the Republican Party had only recently formed. It has been argued that the unexpected Democratic win was due almost entirely to the fact that Garfield was viewed as weaker than Hancock on the hot-bed issue of controlling immigration from China – which both major parties promised to do and which the California electorate was overwhelmingly in favor of.

As a result of Garfield's loss, he became the first Republican to win the presidency without carrying California. This would not occur again until 120 years later. This was the first time ever that California voted for the losing candidate.

Results

Results by county

Notes

References

California
1880
1880 California elections